Yakari, A Spectacular Journey is a 2020 French-Belgian-German animated film directed by Xavier Giacometti. It was distributed by BAC Films. 

The film is an adaptation of Yakari, the Belgian comic book series, originally written by Job and illustrated by Derib, both from Switzerland.

Plot

Yakari, a little Sioux Native American boy, and his faithful steed, Little Thunder, in the great prairie. Yakari has the ability to communicate with all animals, a gift that was transmitted to him by his totem, the Great Eagle.

Cast

Diana Amft
Callum Malloney (US/Irish)
Oscar Douieb
Alan Stanford (Irish)
Martin Sheen (US)
Kathleen Renish
Tara Flynn (US/Irish)
Hans Sigl
Joey D'Auria (US)
Tom Trouffier
Paul Tylak (US/Irish)

Reception

The film was one of the few films released in 2020 to be a box office success.

References

External links
 

2020 films
2020 animated films
2020 independent films
Films about Native Americans
Belgian animated films
French animated films
German animated films
Animated films based on comics
Films based on Belgian comics
Films directed by Toby Genkel
2020s French films